The FreeX FXT is a German single-place, paraglider that was designed and produced by FreeX of Egling in the mid-2000s. It is now out of production.

Design and development
The FXT was designed as a mountaineering descent glider and was only built in a single size. It has shorter lines to facilitate taking off in smaller alpine spaces.

Like all FreeX wings it features internal diagonal bracing.

Specifications (FXT)

References

FXT
Paragliders